The black-and-white monjita (Heteroxolmis dominicanus) is a species of passerine bird in the family Tyrannidae.
It is found in Argentina, Brazil, Uruguay (where it can still be found at the Quebrada de los Cuervos), and possibly Paraguay.

Its natural habitats are subtropical or tropical dry lowland grassland, subtropical or tropical seasonally wet or flooded lowland grassland, arable land, and pastureland.
It is threatened by habitat loss.

The black-and-white monjita is the only species in the genus Heteroxolmis. It is sometimes placed in the genus Xolmis.

References

External links
BirdLife Species Factsheet.

Tyrannidae
Birds of Argentina
Birds of Brazil
Birds of Uruguay
black-and-white monjita
Taxa named by Louis Jean Pierre Vieillot
Taxonomy articles created by Polbot
Taxobox binomials not recognized by IUCN
Birds of the Atlantic Forest